WHBR (channel 33) is a religious television station licensed to Pensacola, Florida, United States, serving northwest Florida and southwest Alabama as an owned-and-operated station of the Christian Television Network (CTN). The station's studios are located on Pensacola Boulevard (US 29) in Pensacola, and its transmitter is located in Robertsdale, Alabama.

History

The station was founded in January 1986.

Technical information

Subchannels
The station's digital signal is multiplexed:

Analog-to-digital conversion
WHBR discontinued regular programming on its analog signal, over UHF channel 33, on January 20, 2009. The station's digital signal remained on its pre-transition UHF channel 34. Through the use of PSIP, digital television receivers display the station's virtual channel as its former UHF analog channel 33.

References

External links
WHBR website
CTN website

Television channels and stations established in 1986
HBR (TV)
1986 establishments in Florida
Christian Television Network affiliates